Hendrikus "Henk" Fraser (born 7 July 1966) is a Dutch football coach and former player who most recently managed Eredivisie side FC Utrecht.

He played as a defender for various Dutch teams. Born in Suriname, he earned seven caps for the Netherlands national team in which he scored one goal. He was a member of the Dutch team at the 1990 FIFA World Cup in Italy under coach Leo Beenhakker. He made his debut for the Netherlands on 6 September 1989, in a friendly against Denmark (2–2).

Playing career
Fraser played for Sparta Rotterdam (1984–86), FC Utrecht (1986–88), Roda JC (1988–90), and Feyenoord Rotterdam (1990–99), with whom he won the Dutch title twice (in 1993 and 1999). After his professional career he became a youth coach at Feyenoord.

Managerial career

ADO Den Haag
Being assistant of Maurice Steijn for two years, Fraser became first the caretaking manager of ADO Den Haag after Steijn had been sacked. However, a month later he signed deal with the club to be the permanent manager until the summer of 2016.

Vitesse

Vitesse Arnhem announced on 13 June 2016 that Fraser would replace Peter Bosz at the start of the 2016–17 season. In his first full season, won the club first major trophy in its 125-year existence. Fraser defeating AZ by a score of 2–0 in the final of the KNVB Cup, with two goals from Ricky van Wolfswinkel. On 5 August 2017 Vitesse were beaten 1–1 (4–2 pen.) at De Kuip, Rotterdam in the Johan Cruyff Shield final by Feyenoord.

On 18 December 2017, Fraser announced he would not be extending his ending contract at the end of the season, leaving  the club. On 12 March 2018, it was announced that russian coach Leonid Slutsky would replace Henk Fraser as the new manager of Dutch Eredivisie side Vitesse Arnhem, for the start of the 2018-19 season. On 23 March 2018, Fraser was presented as the new head coach for Sparta Rotterdam for the next season. Following a significant dip in form, Fraser was relieved of his duties in April 2018, two months prior to the conclusion of his contract at Vitesse.

Sparta Rotterdam
In December 2017, the board of Sparta Rotterdam announced that they had recruited Dick Advocaat to succeed the dismissed Alex Pastoor. The former national team coach of Netherlands signed for six months and was instructed to keep Sparta in the Eredivisie. In the meantime, club management were looking for a head coach for the new season. On 23 March 2018, Fraser signed a two-year contract with Sparta, beginning on 1 July. Despite Advocaat's presence, Sparta were relegated to the second-tier Eerste Divisie after a 3–1 defeat against FC Emmen. In his first season as head coach, Fraser won promotion to the Eredivisie through the play-offs. In the following season, Sparta finished 11th in the COVID-19 abandoned Eredivisie season. In the 2020–21 season, Sparta finished in 8th place in the Eredivisie under the leadership of Fraser, thereby qualifying for the European football play-offs. However, Sparta was defeated by Feyenoord in the first play-off round. On 24 April 2022, Fraser resigned after Sparta told him about their intention to fire assistant manager Aleksandar Ranković. At the time of his resignation Sparta was in the 18th place of the Eredivisie with 4 matches remaining.

FC Utrecht
In April 2022, FC Utrecht announced that Fraser would become the club's new coach for the new season, signing a contract for three seasons. On 14 December 2022, after a training accident with Amin Younes, he left the club.

Managerial statistics

Honours

Player
Feyenoord
Eredivisie: 1992–93, 1998–99
KNVB Cup: 1990–91, 1991–92, 1993–94, 1994–95
Dutch Supercup: 1991

Manager
Vitesse
KNVB Cup: 2016–17
Johan Cruyff Shield runner-up: 2017

References

External links
 CV Henk Fraser

1966 births
Living people
Surinamese emigrants to the Netherlands
Sportspeople from Paramaribo
Dutch footballers
Surinamese footballers
Association football defenders
Netherlands international footballers
Netherlands under-21 international footballers
1990 FIFA World Cup players
Eredivisie players
Sparta Rotterdam players
FC Utrecht players
Roda JC Kerkrade players
Feyenoord players
Dutch football managers
Surinamese football managers
ADO Den Haag managers